Reuel Washburn (May 21, 1793 – March 4, 1878) was an American judge and politician.

Education and early career

Reuel Washburn was born in Raynham, Massachusetts on May 21st, 1793. His father was Attorney Israel Washburn II, LLD (1755-1851) and his mother was Abiah King (1762-1842).
He graduated from Brown University in 1815, then studied law in Paris, Maine, under Albion Parris.
He was admitted to the Maine bar and moved to Livermore, Maine to practice law.

Political career

In 1827 and 1828, Reuel Washburn served in the Maine State Senate.
In 1829, Washburn served on the Maine Governor's Council.
From 1832 to 1835 and 1841, Reuel Washburn served in the Maine House of Representatives. 
He also served as probate court judge.
Reuel Washburn unsuccessfully ran thrice for election to the United States House of Representatives.

Family background

His father, Israel Washburn II, also served in the Maine Legislature.
His brother, Israel Washburn III, was a Massachusetts politician who served twice in the Massachusetts House of Representatives (Terms of Office - 1815–1816 & 1818–1819).
He married Delia King in  Raynham, Massachusetts in 1820
His son was Ganem W. Washburn, Wisconsin State Senator and circuit court judge.

He died suddenly in Livermore, Maine March 4th, 1878.

 His son was Ganem W. Washburn, Wisconsin State Senator and circuit court judge.

Notes

1793 births
1878 deaths
People from Raynham, Massachusetts
People from Livermore, Maine
Brown University alumni
Maine lawyers
Maine state court judges
Maine state senators
Members of the Maine House of Representatives
Members of the Executive Council of Maine
Washburn family
19th-century American politicians
19th-century American judges
19th-century American lawyers